Martina Školková (born 21 December 1984) is a former Slovak handballer who played for the Slovak national team.

References

1984 births
Living people
People from Partizánske
Sportspeople from the Trenčín Region
Slovak female handball players
Expatriate handball players
Slovak expatriate sportspeople in France